The 2013 Kyrgyzstan League was the 22nd season of Kyrgyzstan League, the Football Federation of Kyrgyz Republic's top division of association football. Dordoi Bishkek are the defending champions, having won the previous season. 
Due to sponsorship reasons the league was known as the Shoro Top League.

Teams

Stadia and locations
''Note: Table lists in alphabetical order.

First round

League table

Results

Second round

Championship group

Table

Results

Relegation group

Table

Results

Top goal-scorers
The top scorers are:

References

External links

Football League Kyrgyzstan 

Kyrgyzstan League seasons
1
Kyrgyzstan
Kyrgyzstan